Come On Christmas is the eighth studio album, and the first Christmas album by Dwight Yoakam released in 1997 on Reprise Records. It peaked at No. 32 on Billboard's Top Country Albums chart.

Track listing
 "Come On Christmas" (Dwight Yoakam) - 3:24
 "Run Run Rudolph" (Marvin Brodie, Johnny Marks) - 3:10
 "Silver Bells" (Ray Evans, Jay Livingston) - 2:59
duet with Beth Andersen
 "I'll Be Home for Christmas" (Kim Gannon, Walter Kent, Buck Ram) - 3:50
 "Silent Night" (Franz Gruber, Josef Mohr) - 4:15
 "Santa Claus Is Back in Town" (Jerry Leiber, Mike Stoller) - 2:40
 "The Christmas Song" (Mel Tormé, Robert Wells) - 3:48
 "Away in a Manger" (Public domain) - 3:20
 "Here Comes Santa Claus" (Gene Autry, Oakley Haldeman) - 2:33
 "Santa Can't Stay" (Yoakam) - 3:28

Personnel
 Beth Anderson - duet vocals on "Silver Bells"
 Pete Anderson - acoustic guitar, electric guitar
 Jim Christie - drums
 Davey Crockett - drums
 Skip Edwards - accordion, keyboards, organ, piano
 Tommy Funderburk - background vocals
 Scott Joss - fiddle, mandolin
 Brantley Kearns - fiddle
 Jim Lauderdale - background vocals
 John Pierce - bass
 Taras Prodaniuk - bass
 Marty Rifkin - dobro
 Eddy Shaver - electric guitar
 Ricky Skaggs - background vocals
 Beverly Dahlke-Smith - clarinet, flute, tenor saxophone
 Greg Smith - alto saxophone, baritone saxophone
 Lee Thornburg - horn arrangements, trombone, trumpet
 Dwight Yoakam - autoharp, acoustic guitar, electric guitar, lead vocals

Chart performance

Album

Singles

Dwight Yoakam albums
Reprise Records albums
Albums produced by Pete Anderson
Christmas albums by American artists
Country Christmas albums
1997 Christmas albums